Pisidia is a genus of marine porcelain crabs, comprising the following species:

Pisidia bluteli (Risso, 1816)
Pisidia brasiliensis Haig, 1968
Pisidia dehaanii (Krauss, 1843)
Pisidia delagoae (Barnard, 1955)
Pisidia dispar (Stimpson, 1858)
Pisidia gordoni (Johnson, 1970)
Pisidia inaequalis (Heller, 1861)
Pisidia longicornis (Linnaeus, 1767)
Pisidia longimana (Risso, 1816)
Pisidia magdalenensis (Glassell, 1936)
Pisidia serratifrons (Stimpson, 1858)
Pisidia streptocheles (Stimpson, 1858)
Pisidia striata Yang & Sun, 1990
Pisidia variabilis (Yang & Sun, 1985)

References

Porcelain crabs
Decapod genera
Taxa named by William Elford Leach